The TRANZ 330 is a popular point-of-sale device manufactured by VeriFone in 1985.  The most common application for these units is bank and credit card processing, however, as a general purpose computer, they can perform other novel functions.  Other applications include gift/benefit card processing, prepaid phone cards, payroll and employee timekeeping, and even debit and ATM cards.  They are programmed in a proprietary VeriFone TCL language (Terminal Control Language), which is unrelated to the Tool Command Language used in UNIX environments.

Point of sale companies
Embedded systems
Payment systems
Banking equipment